IndyCar Series on NBC is the blanket title used for telecasts of IndyCar Series racing produced by NBC Sports.

NBC Sports' current involvement with the IndyCar Series dates back to the 2009 season, when Comcast-owned sports network Versus acquired the cable rights to the IndyCar Series under a 10-year deal. Versus was merged into the NBC Sports division and renamed NBC Sports Network (NBCSN) in 2012 after Comcast acquired a controlling stake in NBC Universal.

In 2019, NBC Sports reached a three-year extension to its contract, which also saw NBC acquire the broadcast television rights to the IndyCar Series (replacing ABC). As a result, NBC gained the broadcast rights to the IndyCar Series' flagship event, the Indianapolis 500.

Overview

Background

Early years
When the CART Series was created in 1979, NBC broadcast the races as part of the sports anthology series Sportsworld. NBC soon became the exclusive broadcast partner of CART – although the series' most prestigious race, the Indianapolis 500 was sanctioned by USAC, and had a contract with ABC Sports. NBC carried races from 1979 to 1990, with the Michigan 500, Pocono 500, and Meadowlands their top events. Additionally, NBC televised a close father-son championship duel at Tamiami Park in 1985 between Al Unser and Al Unser Jr., with Big Al defeating Little Al by a single point.

Paul Page was the chief announcer, with Bobby Unser a frequent analyst before both made separate moves to ABC Sports in 1987.

Downturn
In the mid-1980s, CART began airing races on ABC and ESPN. The number of races NBC covered each season began to dwindle during the late portion of the decade. In addition, the broadcasts on NBC were more often tape-delayed and edited, while those on ABC and ESPN were usually live and "flag-to-flag". As the sport was growing in popularity, the organization naturally preferred the more desirable live telecasts.

By 1990, NBC carried only one race each year in July, the Meadowlands Grand Prix. After a three-year hiatus, the final season that NBC had aired a CART race was in 1994, with its coverage of the Toronto race. Jim Lampley (who called the Indy 500 on ABC in 1986-1987) was the anchor for the 1994 telecast.

NBC went away from auto racing after 1994, and did not air another major race until the NASCAR Pennzoil 400 in late 1999.

Champ Car
In the early 2000s, NBC covered occasional American Le Mans Series races and secured a multi-year TV contract with NASCAR, but in 2005, NBC agreed to cover the Champ Car World Series (formerly CART) in Long Beach and Montreal, using Champ Car's new in-house broadcasting team of (at the time) Rick Benjamin, Derek Daly, Jon Beekhuis and Calvin Fish. These races were renewed in 2006, with the addition of San Jose. In 2007, NBC used Bill Weber and Wally Dallenbach Jr., both of whom still were contracted to the network despite NBC dropping their rights to NASCAR following the 2006 season, alongside permanent Champ Car driver analyst Jon Beekhuis, and added their own Marty Snider to the CCWS pitlane team of Michelle Beisner, Cameron Steele and Bill Stephens. With ESPN once again covering the bulk of the calendar, NBC only covered the first two races of the season, in Las Vegas and Long Beach.

Versus/NBCSN
On August 7, 2008, Versus announced a ten-year deal to broadcast at least 13 IndyCar Series events per-season, beginning with the 2009 season. ABC would continue to broadcast the Indianapolis 500, as well as four additional races. Through the deal, Versus began airing one-hour pre-race shows the day before a given race. The channel's parent company Comcast would acquire NBC Universal in 2011, and Versus was re-branded as NBC Sports Network (NBCSN) in 2012.

Expansion to NBC
On March 21, 2018, NBC Sports announced that it had agreed to a new, three-year extension of its contract beginning in the 2019 season, and also acquired the broadcast television rights to replace ABC. As before, NBCSN would continue airing the vast majority of the races, but eight races per-season would be televised by the main NBC network (an expansion over the previous ABC deal, where only five races were shown on broadcast television). The broadcast television package includes the Indianapolis 500, marking the race's move from ABC after 54 consecutive years. NBC Sports Gold also offered a subscription service with IndyCar-related content not broadcast on television. The content was later moved to NBCUniversal's streaming service Peacock Premium in 2021.

NBCSN shut down at the end of 2021. For the 2022 IndyCar Series, there was a significant expansion of broadcast television coverage, with 14 of the 17 events on the schedule being televised by NBC. The remaining races were carried by USA Network, and one race was carried exclusively by Peacock.

Commentators
Bob Jenkins (who was signed as the chief announcer, and returned to IndyCar Racing full-time for the first time since 2001), Jon Beekhuis and Robbie Buhl were initially on the network's broadcast team, along with Jack Arute, Robbie Floyd and Lindy Thackston as pit reporters.

In August 2009, Indianapolis Star reporter Curt Cavin said that Arute would be leaving ESPN at the end of 2009 and join Versus full-time. He was fired from the network due to cost-cutting moves instituted by the network's new Comcast ownership following its merger with NBCUniversal. He was replaced by Kevin Lee, who is also a pit reporter for the Indianapolis Motor Speedway Network. Wally Dallenbach Jr. joined the Versus broadcast team following the merger, replacing Robbie Buhl.

Mike Tirico, Danica Patrick, and Dale Earnhardt Jr. have augmented NBC's broadcast team for the Indianapolis 500.

List of commentators

Lap-by-lap anchors
 Leigh Diffey (2013–present) 
 Kevin Lee – reserve broadcaster (2015–present) (fill-in)
 Omar Amador – lead Spanish-language broadcaster

Color commentators
 Townsend Bell (2013–present)
 James Hinchcliffe (2020, 2022–present)
 Dale Earnhardt Jr. (2019–present)

Pit reporters
 Kevin Lee (2011–present)
 Kelli Stavast (2014-2015, 2018–2021)
 Dillon Welch (2019–present)
 Dave Burns (2020–present)
 Marty Snider (2011–present)
 Nate Ryan (2022–present)

Host of IndyCar Live
 Mike Tirico (2019–present) (NBC Host)
 Jac Collinsworth (2021–present) (NBCSN Host)

Pre-Race Analysts/Presenters
 Danica Patrick (2019–present)
 Dale Earnhardt Jr. (2019–present)
 Rutledge Wood (2019–present)
 Dale Jarrett (2020–present)

Former commentators

Lap-by-lap
 Rick Allen
 Rick Benjamin
 Don Criqui
 Bob Jenkins
 Charlie Jones
 Jim Lampley
 Paul Page
 Brian Till
 Bob Varsha
 Bill Weber

Driver analysts
 Jon Beekhuis
 Robbie Buhl (Versus only)
 Wally Dallenbach Jr.
 Derek Daly
 David Hobbs
 Sam Hornish Jr.
 Tommy Kendall
 Steve Matchett
 Tim Richmond
 Johnny Rutherford
 Jackie Stewart
 Bobby Unser
 Dan Wheldon (Versus only)
 Paul Tracy
 Jimmie Johnson (2021)

Pit reporters
 Jack Arute (Versus only)
 Michelle Beisner
 Calvin Fish
 Robbie Floyd (Versus only)
 Gary Gerould
 Brian Hammons
 Katie Hargitt
 Bruce Jenner
 Anders Krohn
 Sally Larvick
 Cameron Steele
 Bill Stephens
 Lindy Thackston (Versus only)
 Hélio Castroneves (2019)
 Robin Miller
 Jon Beekhuis

References

External links
Motor Sports News - NBC Sports

NBCSN shows
NBC Sports
Sportsworld (American TV series)
2009 American television series debuts
1979 American television series debuts
1994 American television series endings
1970s American television series
1980s American television series
2000s American television series
2010s American television series
2020s American television series
Sports telecast series
NBC
American television series revived after cancellation